Kurtyka is a Polish surname. Notable people with the surname include:

 Janusz Kurtyka (1960–2010), Polish historian
 Michał Kurtyka (born 1973), Polish manager, economist and civil servant 
 Wojciech Kurtyka (born 1947), Polish mountaineer and rock climber

Polish-language surnames